Neil McNeil Catholic High School is an all-boys Roman Catholic secondary school in Toronto, Ontario, Canada. It is named after Neil McNeil, the Roman Catholic Archbishop of Vancouver from 1910 to 1912 and Roman Catholic Archbishop of Toronto from 1912 to 1934. It is administered by the Toronto Catholic District School Board (TCDSB), formerly the Metropolitan Separate School Board.

Neil McNeil is one of 31 high schools run by the TCDSB and one of four all-boys schools, and currently has an enrollment of 826 students. The school offers a Broad-based technology centre, cooperative education program and one of the largest visual arts studios in the city.

This school is a sister school to Notre Dame High School.

History

In 1954, six Holy Ghost Fathers came from Ireland. Their original purpose was to get missionaries as Archbishop James Charles McGuigan wanted an all-boys school in east Toronto and the first high school in Scarborough that was founded in 1958 by the Holy Ghost Fathers. The school was named after Neil McNeil, Archbishop of Toronto from 1912 to 1934. During his entire term as Archbishop, he fought tirelessly for the extension of funding for Catholic secondary schools. He demonstrated in both words and deeds the school motto “Fidelitas in Arduis”, which translates to “Faith In Hard Times”.

From its inception, priests came out to teach. The first principal was Father Troy until his retirement in 1965. At first the school was a two-story building with no gym and no cafeteria. In 1960, the third floor and gymnatorium as well as the cafeteria were added.

In 1967, the school entered an agreement with the Metropolitan Separate School Board (now the Toronto Catholic District School Board, where, by Grade 9 and 10, students would be under the publicly funded separate school system and Grades 11, 12, and 13 would continue as a private school. Since 1987, the school was fully funded by government and Neil McNeil was ceased as a private school. The school was maintained and operated fully by the MSSB although the Spiritans continue to lease the school.

Even though the last priest-principal of the school retired in 1990, the Spiritan presence is alive and well through the Spiritan Scholarship Fund established in 1995. By 1998, the fund disbursed more than $50,000 in scholarship awards for students going to university or community college.

Notre Dame is the "Sister School" of Neil McNeil Catholic Secondary School located not far from Neil McNeil. Both of these schools are regarded as among the oldest and most discriminative high schools in the TCDSB and in the city of Toronto. It is a school renowned for its elaborate and spirited school assemblies and tight knit community. Neil McNeil's patron saint is the Holy Spirit.

The Toronto Catholic District School Board acquired Neil McNeil's school facilities from the Spiritans' in 2009.

Threatened closure and possible relocation
Neil McNeil was one of five schools in the Toronto Catholic District School Board (along with Notre Dame, St. Joan of Arc, St. John Henry Newman, and St. Patrick) that underwent a school accommodation review in June 2009 for possible consolidation, relocation or closure, either having too many or too few students. In December, the board decided to close two schools and relocate another.

The school's parent council co-chair Nicole Waldron said the group was opposed to one of the three options presented by the board for students from Neil to be relocated from Victoria Park and Kingston Road near the Scarborough Bluffs to St. Patrick (on the former Lakeview Secondary School grounds) in the Greenwood and Danforth Avenues area. He stated that “We are here tonight to say that the history of closing schools must end in this process. We are not here to close and to relocate Neil McNeil,” Waldron told a boisterous crowd of about 400 people at a public meeting on January 7 at Neil. The review of the east-end schools came into light because there are too many students at Cardinal Newman, Neil McNeil, Notre Dame and Jean Vanier and too few students at St. Patrick. However, both the sites of Jean Vanier and St. Patrick are currently owned by the Toronto District School Board via the Toronto Lands Corporation (TLC) realtor arm if returned while the Newman property and land is owned by St. Augustine's Seminary.

In this particular grouping, the TCDSB explored three main options:
relocate Notre Dame students to St. Patrick
relocate Neil McNeil students to St. Patrick and/or relocate Notre Dame students to Neil McNeil (if so, the schools could be similar to Michael Power/St. Joseph High School in Etobicoke upon consolidation in 1982); or 
provide a new program focus at St. Patrick.

Since the issue came to light in fall of 2009, local stakeholders have passionately expressed their desire to go with the third option of investing in bettering St. Patrick. Some of the possibilities could include refocusing the school into a centre for the arts, implementing a kindergarten to Grade 12 (K-12) French immersion program or even offering year-round school for students there from K-12.

The end result was St. Patrick became the Centre for the Arts, Media, and Technology in June 2010. Since then, the school board agreed with the Spiritans to make every effort possible to maintain the Neil facility for the next 50 years. That agreement is a clause in the June 2009 purchase agreement between the TCDSB and the Spiritan order.

School spirit

Every Friday morning, the school song is sung, replacing the singing of O Canada on other weekdays.

School spirit and student life is fostered by the elected Student Council. Since the 2011-2012 academic year, Student Council has had autonomy over their affairs, reporting directly to the Principal. This has allowed Council to make quick decisions.

Notable alumni

Javier Acevedo, Olympic Swimmer, Rio 2016 Summer Olympics
David Bourque, musician, Toronto Symphony Orchestra
John Candy, comedic actor
Andrew Cash, singer-songwriter and former Member of Parliament (New Democratic Party)
Andre Champagne, former NHL player
Sebastian Clovis, former CFL player and current TV Personality
Mike Corbett, former NHL player
Mike Corrigan, former NHL player
Mike Del Grande, current chair of the TCDSB, former city councillor
Gary Dineen, former NHL player
Liam Foudy, NHL player
Lawrence Gowan, musician, STYX 
Derek Lee, former Member of Parliament
Billy MacMillan, former NHL player
Keith Martin, Member of Parliament
Jim McKenny, former NHL player
Gerry Meehan, former NHL player
Brad Park, Hall of Fame NHL player
Rod Seiling, former NHL player
Gary Smith, former NHL player
Elvis Thomas, former member of the Canadian National Soccer Team
Mike Walton, former NHL player

See also
List of high schools in Ontario
Toronto Neil McNeil Maroons

References

External links
Neil McNeil High School 
Neil McNeil Catholic Secondary School on MapQuest

Toronto Catholic District School Board
High schools in Toronto
Catholic secondary schools in Ontario
Educational institutions established in 1958
Boys' schools in Canada
1958 establishments in Ontario
Education in Scarborough, Toronto